The GDC/BC Salazar Student Awards was established in 1985 by The Society of Graphic Designers of Canada/British Columbia Chapter in honour of Enrique Salazar.

Background
Enrique Salazar was a founding member of the BC chapter of the GDC in the 1970s and served as BC's National Representative. He was a dedicated and talented designer who shared his passion and knowledge of design through teaching at Capilano University as well as working in the commercial field running his own creative agency Salazar Graphics in partnership with his brother Santiago Salazar, A.K.A. Lisa Salazar. Unfortunately the industry lost Enrique to cancer in June 1985 and the Salazar Awards were created by GDC and founding sponsor Met Printers to continue on his passion and commitment to design and communications education.

The Salazar brothers were born in Colombia and in 1960 their family moved to the United States, making their home in San Jose, California. Enrique attended West Valley College and hoped to eventually become an architect. In 1968, during the height of the war in Vietnam, he accepted a job offer as a draftsman at a new startup high-tech company in Vancouver, Canada. In the meantime, Santiago graduated from high school and enrolled at San Jose State University to study graphic design. Enrique eventually shifted his focus to graphic design as well and without any formal training, began to produce marketing materials for the company he worked for. One day he saw an ad for an in-house graphic designer at Finning Tractor, the largest Caterpillar dealer in North America, where he honed his skills and learned about print production.

After Santiago's graduation in 1972, Enrique convinced him to move to Vancouver so they could start their own studio. Reluctant at first, Santiago eventually caved in to Enrique's persuasion, arriving in Vancouver in 1973. Salazar Graphics was founded the following year, with an office at the west end of Vancouver's Gastown district, which at the time had become the epicenter for graphic designers. In 1980, the Salazar brothers were introduced to the retiring head of the Graphic Design and Illustration program at Capilano University and were invited to develop a course, which they titled "Studio Production," and the two brothers taught the course as a tag-team, alternating each week. For the fall semester in 1984, due to family business obligations, Santiago had to leave the teaching to Enrique. It was at the end of the semester Enrique's health began to deteriorate and resigned as instructor. Santiago returned to teaching the following year.

Since 1956 the GDC has been dedicated to improving graphic design standards and practice, in the workplace and in schools, and the importance of nurturing design professionals and attracting young talent to the industry cannot be over-emphasized. This is the primary reason for events such as Salazar Awards. The Salazar Student Design Awards encourage and support students in taking their design education to a level that will better prepare them for professional practice.

A judging committee of top design professionals review submissions and select winners and honourable mentions based on strategy and rationales provided, as well as the level of visual execution. Winning students and honourable mentions are promoted to the design, advertising and business communities through an awards evening and exhibit of their work.

Speakers at recent Salazar awards ceremonies have included Coudal Partners founder Jim Coudal [2006], Rethink Creative Director Ian Grais [2007], legendary designer Stefan Sagmeister [2008] and Michael Osborne of MOD & Joey's Corner [2009].

Winners
Previous notable winners have included Jim Skipp (1988), Kiky Kambylis (1989), Sean Carter (1990), Nancy Wu  (1991), Oliver Oike (2000) and Don Williams (2002).

2006 winners included Andrew Clequin, Christopher Swift, Henry Huynh, Sherry Jang, Robyn Sommerville, Olga Gryb, Kathryn Wright, Bart Sciana, Yoonju Chung and Sanaz Afshar.

2007 winners included Carlos Guimaraes, Jeff Greenberg & Eric Wada, Jeff Kwok, Stefan Belavy, Ryan Uhrich & Marcos Ceravolo, Ross Milne, Chelsea McKenzie, Megan Brooks, Kim Ridgewell, Penelope Tse, Ashley Hostasek, Ryan Mah, Abi Huynh & Ross Milne, Terry Chau, Eric Arnold, Megan Seely, Ross Milne, Megan Brooks, Marty Chow and Eric Arnold

2013 winners include Daniel Gleiberman & Elena Syrovatkina from Emily Carr University for Motion & Video; Joan Gurney, Capilano University for Interactive; Alex Harvey-Wickens, Capilano University for Print; and Camille Segur, Capilano University for Brand Identity.

External links
 Review of 2007 Salazar Awards 
 Review of 2006 Salazar Awards 
 Salazar 2006 with keynote speaker Jim Coudal, introduced by Mark Busse
 2007 Awards with keynote speaker Ian Grais, introduced by Mark Busse

Competitions
Graphic design